Milan Milakov (born 24 June 1930) is a retired Serbian pole vaulter who represented SFR Yugoslavia at the 1952 Summer Olympics and won 13th place. He was a member of the Athletics Club Red Star Belgrade. He was born in Ada.

References
 Biography at sports reference

External links
  

1930 births
Possibly living people
Serbian male pole vaulters
Yugoslav male pole vaulters
Athletes (track and field) at the 1952 Summer Olympics
Olympic athletes of Yugoslavia
People from Ada, Serbia